Tammy Waine is an English former footballer who played for Fulham L.F.C..

References

Living people
English women's footballers
Brighton & Hove Albion W.F.C. players
Fulham L.F.C. players
Women's association football defenders
FA Women's National League players
Year of birth missing (living people)